L. D. Giddens and Son Jewelry Store is a historic commercial building located at Goldsboro, Wayne County, North Carolina.  It was built between 1839 and 1847, and is a two-story, three bay, brick building.  It measures 104 feet long and 23 feet, 6 inches wide. It features cast iron ornamentation and a freestanding clock (1877) at the street measuring 14 feet high. L. D. Giddens and Son was founded in 1859 and may be the oldest jewelry store in North Carolina.

It was listed on the National Register of Historic Places in 1979.

References

Goldsboro, North Carolina
Commercial buildings on the National Register of Historic Places in North Carolina
Commercial buildings completed in 1847
Buildings and structures in Wayne County, North Carolina
National Register of Historic Places in Wayne County, North Carolina
1859 establishments in North Carolina